Didier Rimaud (1922–2003) was a French Jesuit, composer and poet.

Biography 

Rimaud received Broquette Gonin Price (literature) in 1981.

References

1922 births
2003 deaths
People from Carnac
Composers of Christian music
20th-century French Jesuits
French composers
French male composers
Writers from Brittany
French male poets
20th-century French poets
20th-century French musicians
Winners of the Prix Broquette-Gonin (literature)
20th-century French male writers
20th-century French male musicians